Thomas Bek (also spelled Beck) (1282 – 2 February 1347) was the Bishop of Lincoln from 1341 until his death.  He was a member of the same family as Antony Bek, Bishop of Durham, and Thomas Bek, Bishop of St David's.

Bek was elected on about 1 March 1341 and consecrated on 7 July 1342. He died on 2 February 1347.

Citations

References
 

1282 births
1347 deaths
Bishops of Lincoln
14th-century English Roman Catholic bishops